The men's slalom at the 1956 Winter Olympics was held on the Col Druscié run on Tuesday, 31 January. Fifty-seven athletes finished both runs and 23 were disqualified during the first run, and eight during the second. Twenty-nine countries were represented and Toni Sailer of Austria won the second of his three gold medals at these Games. Chiharu Igaya won the silver (the only medal for of Japan at these Games) and Stig Sollander of Sweden took the bronze.

U.S. head coach Robert Sheehan filed a protest that Igaya straddled a gate on the second run, a five-second penalty at the time. Although backed up by the Swedish coach, an infraction was not called and after hours of deliberation, Igaya was awarded the silver medal.

Results

* 5 seconds penalty added.
** 10 seconds penalty added.
Source:

See also

 1956 Winter Olympics

References

Men's alpine skiing at the 1956 Winter Olympics